Jan Jacob Verdenius (born 11 September 1973) is a Norwegian cross-country skier who competed from 1994 to 2002. His only World Cup victory was in a sprint event at Engelberg, Switzerland in 2000.

Verdenius's best finish at the FIS Nordic World Ski Championships was tenth in the sprint event at Lahti in 2001.

His club was Byåsen IL.

Cross-country skiing results
All results are sourced from the International Ski Federation (FIS).

World Championships

World Cup

Season standings

Individual podiums
 1 victory
 3 podiums

References

External links

1973 births
Living people
Norwegian male cross-country skiers